The suprasternal notch, also known as the fossa jugularis sternalis, jugular notch, or Plender gap, is a large, visible dip in between the neck in humans, between the clavicles, and above the manubrium of the sternum.

Structure 
The suprasternal notch is a visible dip in between the neck, between the clavicles, and above the manubrium of the sternum. It is at the level of the T2 and T3 vertebrae. The trachea lies just behind it, rising about 5 cm above it in adults.

Clinical significance
Intrathoracic pressure is measured by using a transducer held in such a way over the body that an actuator engages the soft tissue that is located above the suprasternal notch. Arcot J. Chandrasekhar, MD of Loyola University, Chicago, is the author of an evaluative test for the aorta using the suprasternal notch. The test can help recognize the following conditions:
 Aneurysm
 Dissecting aneurysm
 Atherosclerosis
 Hypertension

To carry out this test it is necessary to place an index finger or middle finger on the notch and palpate it. A prominent pulse may be indicative of an uncoiled aorta, arch aneurysm, or a tortuous blood vessel.

References

External links

blog entry on Ucipital Mapilary citing film dialogue.

Bones of the thorax